), is a Mongolian-born naturalised-Japanese professional sumo wrestler. Wrestling for the Isegahama stable, he entered professional sumo in January 2011 and took the second division jūryō championship in his debut as a sekitori in September 2013. He took the top makuuchi division championship in May 2015, only 25 tournaments after his professional debut, which is the third-fastest behind Asashōryū and Takanohana's 23 tournaments. This earned him promotion to sumo's second-highest rank of ōzeki.

Terunofuji then suffered from knee injuries and other health problems. Surviving kadoban (in danger of demotion from the rank of ōzeki) on three previous occasions, he was finally demoted after the September 2017 tournament. After a long injury layoff he fell to the second-lowest jonidan division in March 2019 and staged a successful comeback and returned to the makuuchi division the following year, the first wrestler to do so from such a low rank. Terunofuji won his return tournament in the top division in July 2020. He earned his second promotion to ōzeki following a third championship win in March 2021, which he immediately followed with another tournament championship in May 2021. Following a runner-up performance in the July 2021 tournament, he was promoted to become the sport's 73rd yokozuna. He acquired Japanese citizenship the following month, taking the name . Following the retirement of fellow Mongolian Hakuhō in September 2021, Terunofuji became the only active yokozuna.

Overall, he has seven top division championships, has been runner-up in seven tournaments, and has nine special prizes. Sumo commentator John Gunning called Terunofuji's comeback "a tale unparalleled in sumo history."

Early life and sumo background
In childhood, Gan-Erdene was coached in judo by the father of yokozuna Hakuhō, but his coach saw in him a predisposition for sumo and helped arrange for him to move to Japan as a student at Tottori Jōhoku High School to join its well-known sumo program. Future top division wrestler Ichinojō travelled with him and joined the same school. He continued his rivalry with Ichinojō into the professional ranks, remarking in 2015, "What matters is who will make it to the ozeki rank first." As a third year student, Gan-Erdene's team took the championship at a national inter-high school sumo tournament.

Career

Early career
Upon graduating, he chose to turn professional and joined Magaki stable. He entered the ring in the same tournament as soon to be well-known Chiyotairyū and Jōkōryū. From his first pro tournament in July 2011 he excelled, posting only three losses in three tournaments and spending only one tournament in each of the lower divisions of jonokuchi, jonidan and sandanme. In his sandanme tournament in November 2011, he had a perfect 7–0 record and participated in a playoff for the championship, which he lost to the aforementioned Jōkōryū, then still known as Sakumayama. From his third division makushita debut in January 2012, he had three consecutive 5–2 records before posting two consecutive losing tournaments in July and September 2012, the only two of his career up to that point. He bounced back from this in the following November tournament, garnering a 4–3 record. For the next four tournaments his success continued and he never had more than two losses in any tournament. During the period, his stable closed, and he transferred to Isegahama stable. He had become frustrated with a lack of training opportunities at the small Magaki stable, as with the ill health of his stablemaster and various scandals there were sometimes no other coaches or wrestlers present. At Isegahama by contrast he was able to practice with many higher ranked wrestlers to improve his technique. His 6–1 record at makushita 4 in July 2013 was enough to earn him promotion to the salaried ranks of jūryō in September 2013.

Upon entering jūryō he changed his shikona surname to Terunofuji, a combination of two former yokozuna, Terukuni and Asahifuji (his own stablemaster), and a reflection of the high expectations placed on him. He took the jūryō championship in his debut tournament, beating future maegashira Kagamiō on the last day to even their records and forcing a playoff bout against Kagamiō, which he also won. An 8–7 record in the following November tournament and a 12–3 record in the January 2014 tournament earned him promotion to the top makuuchi division in March 2014.

Makuuchi division

In his makuuchi division debut he had only a 2–7 record on the 9th day. However, from then on he won six straight bouts in six days to pull out a kachi-koshi or winning tournament. Then in the following May tournament he started out with an unpromising 4–6 record, but then won 5 straight to finish with a strong showing of 9–6. Two tournaments later in the September 2014 tournament at maegashira 1 he was up against top notch competition, including several san'yaku or titled wrestlers, and he only managed to eke out a 6–9 record.  This was only his third make-koshi or losing record in a tournament in his career and his first in the salaried rank. He only fell to maegashira 2 though, being helped by bad showings from several other wrestlers. It was in this tournament in November 2014 that he truly began to show his mettle in the top division; after going only 4–6, he beat an ōzeki and two sekiwake in the last 5 days to pull off an 8–7. In January 2015, he defeated the ōzeki Gōeidō and Kisenosato, the sekiwake Aoiyama and both active komusubi on the way to an 8–7 record. He was awarded the Fighting Spirit Prize, or kantosho, his first special prize.

He was promoted to the rank of sekiwake for the next tournament. In the March Grand Tournament of 2015, he defeated yokozuna Hakuhō (unbeaten in his last 36 matches), and finished runner-up with a 13–2 record, having also defeated both komusubi as well as the ōzeki Gōeidō and Kotoshōgiku. He received his second Fighting Spirit Prize and was also awarded the prize for Outstanding Performance. After his final contest he said "I'll shoot for double-digit wins at the next tournament and hopefully that will lead to victory. Now I just want to take a long rest". In May Terunofuji was beaten on the opening day of the Natsu basho by Sadanoumi, but won his next seven including victories over both komusubi and the ōzeki Kotoshōgiku. After defeats by Tokushōryū on day nine and Hakuhō on day eleven he recovered to win his next three matches including victories over Kisenosato and the sekiwake Myōgiryū to enter the final day in a tie for first place with Hakuhō. In his final match he defeated the Bulgarian maegashira Aoiyama by yori-kiri or force-out, and then saw Hakuhō lose to Harumafuji. The result was that Terunofuji, in his eighth top-division tournament, was handed his first championship with a 12–3 record and was awarded the Fighting Spirit Prize for the third time. Terunofuji admitted that he had been "almost in tears" at the conclusion of the tournament and said, "When I was 15 years old I watched sumo and wanted to become a sumo wrestler and so came to Japan. It was a dream of mine to win the championship. To actually win it is like a dream." A few days after the tournament, Terunofuji's official promotion to ōzeki was announced in a press conference. He was the first to be promoted to ōzeki having previously spent only two tournaments in san'yaku since Yoshibayama 64 years earlier. As Yoshibayama's promotion came before the six-tournaments per year system, Terunofuji was the first to be promoted after only four months in san'yaku.

Following Terunofuji's first top division yūshō, Japan Times columnist Mark Buckton suggested that he had the potential to be promoted one day to the highest rank of yokozuna.

Ōzeki
On his first appearance at his new rank Terunofuji won nine of his first ten matches to reach a tie for the lead, but losses to Hakuhō, Kakuryū and Kotoshōgiku saw him end the tournament with an 11–4 record. In September he won his first eleven matches to establish a clear lead over the opposition, but then lost to Tochiōzan and Kisenosato, sustaining a knee injury in the latter match. Another loss to Gōeidō saw him enter the final day with eleven wins, one behind the yokozuna Kakuryū. In the final scheduled match on day 15 Terunofuji defeated Kakuryū to level their scores but lost the ensuing play-off. Terunofuji's knee injury continued to trouble him in November but he posted nine wins including victories over the yokozuna Kakuryū and Hakuhō.

The year 2016 was a hard one for Terunofuji, with the lack of strength and flexibility in his knees affecting his performances. He was kadoban, or danger of relegation from ōzeki three times, but was able to hold on to his rank each time by getting a winning record in the following tournament. In January he won three of his first five bouts before withdrawing from the tournament with a broken right collar bone and damaged meniscus in his left knee, after a bout with Kyokushūhō. This was the first withdrawal of his career. He underwent arthroscopic surgery on his left knee shortly afterwards. Despite his injury problems he announced that he would contest the next tournament in March, where he was kadoban, or in danger of demotion from ōzeki rank. In March, Terunofuji still seemed well below his best but maintained his rank with eight wins. In May, however, his form slumped as he lost his last thirteen matches to end with a career-worst record of 2–13.  He just managed to preserve his rank on the final day of the following Nagoya tournament by defeating Kaisei for an 8–7 record, but was kadoban yet again after recording only four wins in September.  In November 2016 he was kadoban and under danger of demotion if he failed to secure at least eight wins in the tournament. Things didn't start off on the right foot as he lost his first two matches, however things took a turn as he proceeded to win the next seven in a row including a win over fellow ōzeki Kotoshōgiku. Terunofuji then had two losses against Kakuryū and Gōeidō, but was able to get his winning record on day 12 against Hakuhō which erased his kadoban status and secured his rank.  Terunofuji finished out the year with three losses and ended the tournament with an 8–7 record.

In the January 2017 tournament Terunofuji managed only four wins, making him kadoban for the fourth time. The Osaka tournament in March saw a dramatic return to form as he won his first five matches before losing to Takayasu, and then won his next seven to take a share of the lead with a win over Kakuryū on Day 13. On Day 14 he became the sole leader after he defeated Kotoshōgiku and the injured Kisenosato lost to Kakuryū, but he was booed by the crowd for sidestepping his opponent at the initial charge. He missed out on his second championship on the final day as he was defeated twice by Kisenosato, once in their regulation match and again in the resulting playoff. The Japan Sumo Association was questioned by the government after the tournament when media reports suggested that Terunofuji was subjected to hate speech taunts from the crowd after his controversial win over Kotoshōgiku, with the expression "Go back to Mongolia" reportedly used.

Terunofuji underwent endoscopic surgery on his left knee after the May 2017 tournament, but did not recover as well as expected. He entered the Nagoya tournament in July but withdrew after four losses in the first five days, citing a meniscal injury to the knee. The September tournament saw a repeat of Nagoya, with Terunofuji winning only one of his first five matches before he was forced to withdraw because of the knee injury, which he aggravated in a loss to Shōhōzan on Day 5. Having failed to record a winning score in two consecutive tournaments he lost his ōzeki status after 14 tournaments at the rank.

Injuries, demotion and comeback
Terunofuji could have made an immediate return to ōzeki with at least ten wins in the November 2017 tournament, but he withdrew on Day 5 after losing his first four matches, citing a meniscus tear in his left knee. He withdrew from the January 2018 tournament on Day 3 after losing his first two bouts, due to a viscera disorder, and was demoted to jūryō as a result. He is the fourth former ōzeki to fall to jūryō and the first since Baruto in 2013. In March 2018 he completed a tournament for the first time since May of the previous year but could only score six wins against nine losses from jūryō 5. He withdrew from the May 2018 tournament on Day 4, but returned from Day 11 in an attempt to stave off demotion to makushita. His stablemaster reported that in addition to diabetes and knee problems he was also suffering from kidney stones. However he failed to win any matches on his return and was demoted to makushita. He was the first ōzeki and first top division tournament winner to fall to that division. He had surgery on both knees on 25 June and withdrew from the July 2018 tournament, with his stablemaster indicating he wanted Terunofuji to have his knees healed properly before competing again. He was also absent for the next three tournaments, which caused him to fall to the second-lowest jonidan division. He returned to competition in March 2019 and won all seven of his matches, although he lost a playoff for the jonidan championship to fellow Mongolian Roga. This was his first appearance since May 2018, and his first winning record since May 2017. In his next three tournaments he lost just one bout in each, progressing to makushita 10 by November 2019. In the Kyushu tournament he won the makushita championship with a perfect 7–0 record, ensuring his return to the sekitori ranks.

In his first tournament as a sekitori since May 2018, Terunofuji won his second consecutive yūshō by clinching the jūryō championship on Day 13 of the January tournament with 13 straight wins. He lost his final two matches to Nishikigi and Daiamami, ending any outside hopes of immediate promotion back to makuuchi, and was ranked at jūryō 3 for the March 2020 tournament.

Return to makuuchi

In the March tournament, Terunofuji finished with a 10–5 record and earned promotion back to makuuchi, after 14 tournaments outside the top division. He is the first top division wrestler to fall to jonidan and successfully return to makuuchi. After the May basho was cancelled due to COVID-19, Terunofuji continued his comeback in the July tournament by winning his second top-division yūshō with a 13–2 record. He secured the championship by defeating sekiwake Mitakeumi on the final day and also won the Technique and Outstanding Performance prizes as well. The 30 tournaments between this victory and his previous yūshō in May 2015 is the second longest gap between top division championships after Kotonishiki's 43. Speaking to reporters online following his victory, Terunofuji thanked his stablemaster, who convinced him to keep working on healing himself when Terunofuji had asked for permission to retire. In the September 2020 tournament from maegashira 1 Terunofuji secured a winning record with eight wins, before withdrawing on Day 13 with a left knee injury. He returned to the san'yaku ranks for the first time in three years at the November 2020 tournament. This was the first time he had been ranked as a komusubi.

Terunofuji continued to perform well at the November 2020 basho, going into the final day with a 12–2 record. This score put him one win behind ōzeki Takakeishō in the yūshō race. Terunofuji faced Takakeishō on the final day, defeating him and bringing their scores level to force a yūshō playoff. However, Takakeishō won the playoff and claimed the championship. For his efforts, Terunofuji was awarded the ginō-shō or technique prize at the tournament's conclusion. He was the runner-up again in January 2021 at the sekiwake rank, when he defeated both the active ōzeki and secured another ginō-shō.

Return to ōzeki

Terunofuji acknowledged before the March 2021 tournament that he would need a three basho total of 33 wins to be considered for ōzeki promotion and that he would "fight hard." His own stablemaster, Isegahama (former yokozuna Asahifuji), is the head of the refereeing department and in charge of drawing up the rankings. With his fellow Mongolians Hakuhō and Kakuryū withdrawn due to injury, Terunofuji won his third career yūshō and earned his third shukun-shō, finishing with a 12–3 record – more than the 10 wins needed for an expected promotion to ōzeki once again. He is the first wrestler to win three top division championships from a rank below ōzeki. Terunofuji later told reporters that barely qualifying for promotion to the sport's second-highest rank was not enough, as he felt that his stablemaster's reputation was on the line. The Sumo Association unanimously approved his promotion on 31 March. He accepted "with great humility" when informed by JSA representatives at Isegahama stable. He later reiterated his gratitude to his stablemaster, adding that he would devote himself to training and aim higher.

In May 2021 he won his first ten bouts, leading the rest of the field by two victories, but suffered a hansoku or loss by disqualification on Day 11 when he was determined by the ringside judges to have pulled Myōgiryū's topknot. He suffered another defeat to Endō on Day 14, but remained the leader. He won his fourth championship after defeating fellow ōzeki Takakeishō in a playoff, having lost to him in their regulation match. He became the first person since the kadoban system was introduced in July 1969 to win the Emperor's Cup immediately after returning to the ōzeki rank.

Promotion to yokozuna

In the July 2021 tournament, Terunofuji was in contention for the Emperor's Cup with a perfect record after 14 days before losing in the final match to fellow Mongolian-born yokozuna Hakuhō, who won the championship with a perfect 15–0 record. This was their first meeting in four years, and only the sixth time in sumo history that two wrestlers had fought on the final day with  undefeated records. Despite missing out on the championship, Terunofuji's performance over the last three tournaments — 38 victories, with a top division championship at the sekiwake rank followed by a championship and a runner-up performance at the ōzeki rank — was enough for the Sumo Association to call for an extraordinary meeting to discuss Terunofuji's promotion to become the sport's 73rd yokozuna, the first yokozuna of the Reiwa Era.  This completed Terunofuji's historic comeback after dropping from the second-highest ōzeki rank to the second-lowest jonidan division. He is only the second rikishi in history who was demoted from the rank of ōzeki but still managed the promotion to yokozuna, the only other one being Mienoumi in 1979, and is also only the fourth rikishi who got promoted to yokozuna after only two tournaments after promotion to ōzeki, after Tochigiyama in 1918, Futabayama in 1937, and Terukuni in 1942. At 29 years and 7 months, he is also the sixth oldest rikishi to be promoted to yokozuna.

The Yokozuna Deliberation Council recommended Terunofuji's promotion on 19 July, and the Sumo Association formally approved the promotion on 21 July. In his acceptance speech, Terunofuji said he would hold on to his "unshakeable spirit and aim to foster greater dignity and power as a yokozuna." Later, he told reporters that he wanted to have a more determined mindset in sumo, adding that he wanted to understand what it means to be a yokozuna and be a role model to others.

Terunofuji adopted the Shiranui style used by his stablemaster Isegahama and took part in his first dohyō-iri (ring-entering ceremony) as a yokozuna on 24 August at Meiji Shrine in Tokyo. Due to the coronavirus pandemic, the ceremony was delayed by one month after his promotion. The ceremony was closed to the public, but the Sumo Association streamed the event on YouTube. Stablemates Terutsuyoshi and Takarafuji served as the tsuyuharai (dew sweeper) and tachimochi (sword bearer), respectively, and Terunofuji borrowed the tachi used for the ceremony to his stable master. In preparation for his first tournament as Yokozuna, Terunofuji received a tachi from the sumo club supporters' association of Johoku High School (his former school). According to the supporter's association, the tachi was made in 1576 and is about 1 meter long.

Yokozuna career

Terunofuji won his first sumo tournament as a yokozuna in September 2021 with a 13–2 record. Hakuho's retirement was formalized soon after the tournament ended, leaving Terunofuji as sumo's only yokozuna. Terunofuji's sixth career yūshō in makuuchi was assured on Day 14 of the November 2021 tournament after he defeated Abi, who had been the only other wrestler in contention for the Emperor's Cup at that time. He would end up defeating Takakeishō on the final day for his first perfect record in makuuchi. Terunofuji was humble during his public interview, appreciating the support of fans in Kyushu who did not see last year's November basho because of COVID-19 and saying that he was "not such a talented wrestler capable of doing many things." Terunofuji became the first sumo wrestler to win his first two tournaments at the yokozuna rank since Taihō, who accomplished the feat in January 1962. He was also the first wrestler to win four tournaments in a year since Hakuhō in 2014.

In January 2022 Terunofuji's performance was somewhat hampered by knee injuries and he lost to Mitakeumi in a title-decider on the final day to finish on 11–4, two wins off the pace. In February 2022 the Sumo Association announced that, along with a number of other high-ranking wrestlers, he had tested positive for COVID-19. He missed ten days of training as a result.

Terunofuji withdrew on Day 6 of the March 2022 basho in Osaka citing issues with his right heel and left knee, both of which he had injured in the past. The issues would require about one month of treatment, according to a medical certificate submitted to the Sumo Association. Terunofuji's withdrawal came after he was defeated by Daieishō and, for the second straight tournament, Tamawashi. It was his first kyūjō since his promotion to sumo's highest rank.

At the May 2022 Natsu Basho in Tokyo, Terunofuji overcame early losses to clinch the tournament with a 12–3 record. He avoided what would have been a four-way playoff with Daieishō, Takanoshō and Sadanoumi by beating Mitakeumi on the final day. In an online press conference the following day, he spoke of his relief at his victory and paid tribute to his former Isegahama stablemate Aminishiki ahead of his retirement ceremony, who Terunofuji said had given him advice on how to deal with his knee injuries.

In July Terunofuji was in contention for the championship on the final day but his defeat to Takakeishō meant he finished on 11–4, one win behind maegashira Ichinojō who took the title with a 12–3 record. In the September tournament he pulled out on Day 10, having already suffered four losses, due to injuries to both knees. This was the 13th withdrawal of his career, and his second since becoming .

In September 2022, Terunofuji decided to withdraw from the remainder of the tournament on Day 10, having given away four kinboshi to fall to a 5–4 record. In a telephone interview, his stable master Isegahama-oyakata said Terunofuji had been diagnosed with osteoarthritis in both knees and bone contusion in the right knee, which was "completely out of alignment".  Isegahama said, "He needs to heal properly, not just rest. In some cases, surgery will be necessary. I think the inflammation will stop in a few days, but after that, I have to think carefully about what to do." Terunofuji had surgery on both knees on October 18, with his stablemaster indicating he would not return to competition until fully healed. On 11 November he formally withdrew from the November tournament in Fukuoka.

On the January 2023 banzuke Terunofuji was designated as yokozuna-ōzeki because there was just one wrestler (Takakeishō) listed at the ōzeki rank. He withdrew from the tournament, however, in order to continue recovering from the surgery on his knees. He withdrew again in March after stablemaster Isegahama suggested that there was "still something missing" upon observing Terunofuji's training.

Fighting style
Terunofuji is a yotsu-sumo wrestler who favours grappling techniques as opposed to pushing and thrusting (oshi-sumo). His preferred grip on his opponent's mawashi or belt is migi-yotsu, a left hand outside, right hand inside position. His favourite winning kimarite or technique is a straightforward yori-kiri, or force out, which has accounted for over 40 percent of his career victories. Prior to his demotion from the top division, he often relied on his physical strength to lift opponents with both arms and carry them out of the dohyō, a style of wrestling which was criticized for increasing the burden on his knees.

Personal life

Terunofuji was married in February 2018 to a Mongolian exchange student, although he did not announce it until January 2021. They have known each other since before his first ōzeki promotion. Their wedding reception took place on 11 February 2021 at the Tomioka Hachiman Shrine in Tokyo's Kōtō ward. He thanked his wife for her support during his long injury layoff, as during this period he gave up drinking and she followed nutritional advice from his doctor in preparing his meals.

In March 2021 Terunofuji revealed that he was in the process of acquiring Japanese citizenship, which would enable him to stay in sumo after retirement as an elder of the Japan Sumo Association. In August 2021, the Sumo Association announced that Terunofuji was officially a Japanese citizen. Terunofuji explained that he had made the decision to seek Japanese citizenship in 2019 following his fall to the second-lowest jonidan division, after consultation with his family, stablemaster and colleagues. His legal name is Seizan Suginomori, created by taking the surname and "sei" part of the forename from his stablemaster's real name of Seiya Suginomori.

Career record

See also
List of sumo tournament top division champions
List of sumo tournament top division runners-up
List of sumo tournament second division champions
Glossary of sumo terms
List of active sumo wrestlers
List of non-Japanese sumo wrestlers
List of yokozuna
Active special prize winners

References

External links

1991 births
Living people
Japanese sumo wrestlers
Mongolian sumo wrestlers
Mongolian emigrants to Japan
Naturalized citizens of Japan
Sportspeople from Ulaanbaatar
Yokozuna